Mason Malmuth is an American poker player, and author of books on both poker and gambling. He is the owner of Two Plus Two Publishing, which publishes books and runs an online gambling discussion forum.

Malmuth was born in 1951 and grew up in Coral Gables, Florida. In 1973, he received his bachelor's degree in math, and in 1975 he received his master's degree in math both from Virginia Tech.

The books are authored by himself, David Sklansky, and other writers including Dan Harrington, Bill Robertie, Ray Zee, Matt Janda, Philip Newall, Ed Miller, Nick Grudzien, Collin Moshman and Alan Schoonmaker.

Books by Mason Malmuth

Malmuth has also written over 600 articles for various magazines and publications.

References

American poker players
Virginia Tech alumni
Living people
Year of birth missing (living people)
American gambling writers
American male non-fiction writers
Writers from Coral Gables, Florida